Valentin Vasile Badea (born 23 October 1982 in Alexandria) is a Romanian former football player. He played as a striker. His last contract was with Liga II team UTA Arad.

Club career
On 2001 Jiul bought Badea for €1,000 from Rulmentul Alexandria.
Prior to 2006, when Badea joined Steaua București, he also played for Rulmentul Alexandria, Jiul Petroşani and FC Vaslui.
He was discovered by Ioan Sdrobiş while he was playing for Rulmentul Alexandria in Romania's third division and where Badea was the team's top goalscorer. Sdrobiş then brought him to Jiul Petroşani, and then to FC Vaslui where he was the coach.
In 2006 Steaua paid €1,000,000 for Badea.
On 23 August 2006 he has scored two goals in the match against Standard Liège, in the third qualifying round of UEFA Champions League, goals which sent Steaua București into the group stage after ten years of absence.
On 20 December 2009, he was released from FC Universitatea Craiova.
On 24 February 2010, he signed with Al Ain.

Statistics

Titles

Trivia
Steaua's Gigi Becali was quoted by the press as saying that Badea will once become the Romanian top striker.

References

External links

1982 births
Living people
People from Alexandria, Romania
Romanian footballers
Association football forwards
CSM Jiul Petroșani players
FC Steaua București players
FC Steaua II București players
FC Vaslui players
Panserraikos F.C. players
FC U Craiova 1948 players
FC Brașov (1936) players
FC Politehnica Iași (1945) players
CS Concordia Chiajna players
FCV Farul Constanța players
FC UTA Arad players
Romanian expatriate footballers
Expatriate footballers in the United Arab Emirates
Romanian expatriate sportspeople in the United Arab Emirates
Expatriate footballers in Greece
Romanian expatriate sportspeople in Greece